Lone Fight is a broad family name related exclusively to the Mandan, Hidatsa, and Arikara Nation of the Fort Berthold Reservation in North Dakota.

Notable Lone Fights include:
 Edward Lone Fight, (b. 1940), chairman of the Three Affiliated Tribes and Native American compensation activist
 William Harjo LoneFight, (b. 1966), Native American political leader

See also
Lone Fighter,  a 1923 American silent western film